Achondrostoma salmantinum is a species of freshwater fish in the family Cyprinidae. It is native to five tributaries in the Duero basin in the Province of Salamanca, Spain. It is normally found in clear, seasonal streams with sandy substrates, preferring the slower flowing stretches which have an abundant vegetation of aquatic macrophytes. The species is common within its restricted range but it has a declining population and it is threatened mainly by falling water tables caused by the abstraction of water for agriculture and the construction if dams and weirs.

References 

Achondrostoma
Fish described in 2007
Cyprinid fish of Europe
Endemic fish of the Iberian Peninsula